Mohamed Sayed Hamdi (11 December 1931 – 16 October 1992) was an Egyptian gymnast. He competed in eight events at the 1952 Summer Olympics.

References

1931 births
1992 deaths
Egyptian male artistic gymnasts
Olympic gymnasts of Egypt
Gymnasts at the 1952 Summer Olympics
Place of birth missing